Corymbia leichhardtii, commonly known as rustyjacket, Leichhardt's rustyjacket, or yellow jacket, is a species of tree that is endemic to Queensland. It has rough, tessellated bark on the trunk and branches, lance-shaped or curved adult leaves, flower buds in groups of seven, white flowers and barrel-shaped, urn-shaped or shortened spherical fruit.

Description
It has rough, tessellated, thick, soft, pale brown to yellow-brown or orange on the trunk and branches. Flowering occurs between January and March and the flowers are white.

Taxonomy and naming
Rustyjacket was first formally described in 1906 by Frederick Manson Bailey in 1906 in the Queensland Agricultural Journal as Eucalyptus leichhardtii. In 1995, Ken Hill and Lawrie Johnson changed the name to Corymbia leichhardtii. The specific epithet (leichhardtii) honours the explorer Ludwig Leichhardt.

Distribution and habitat
Corymbia leichhardtii has a range stretching from Mareeba in North Queensland south to Salvator Rosa National Park in Central Queensland. It is found in tropical and subtropical sclerophyll woodlands and grows in sandy soils over sandstone.

Conservation status
This eucalypt is classified as of "least concern" under the Queensland Government Nature Conservation Act 1992.

See also
 List of Corymbia species

References

leichhardtii
Myrtales of Australia
Flora of Queensland
Plants described in 1906